Kissing Cup's Race is a 1920 British silent sports film directed by Walter West and starring Violet Hopson, Gregory Scott and Clive Brook. It is based on the poem Kissing Cup's Race by Campbell Rae Brown.

The Bioscope described the film at the time as "probably the most exciting British racing film yet produced". In a slightly later review they said "The story is not complicated with the usual thrilling adventures, but nor has it the simplicity of Campbell Rae Brown's famous recitation; while many of the details are even less convincing than in the average turf drama. It is only in the technique of the racing scenes that there is any exceptional skill".

Cast
 Violet Hopson - Constance Medley 
 Gregory Scott - Lord Hilhoxton 
 Clive Brook - Lord Rattlington 
 Arthur Walcott - John Wood 
 Philip Hewland - Vereker 
 Adeline Hayden Coffin - Lady Corrington 
 Joe Plant - Bob Doon

References

External links

Poem by Campbell Rae Brown on which the film was based

1920 films
British silent feature films
British horse racing films
1920s sports films
1920s English-language films
Broadwest films
Films directed by Walter West
British black-and-white films
1920s British films